Michael Okoro Ibe (born 6 June 1995) is a Nigerian international footballer who plays for Mash'al Mubarek as a midfielder.

References
 

1995 births
Living people
Nigerian footballers
Nigeria international footballers
Akwa United F.C. players
Association football midfielders
Nigerian expatriate footballers
Nigerian expatriate sportspeople
Expatriate footballers in Uzbekistan
Abia Warriors F.C. players
Sportspeople from Port Harcourt